Dongying railway station is a railway station in Dongying District, Dongying, Shandong, China. It is the terminus of the Zibo–Dongying railway. The station handles both passengers and freight.

History 
The station opened with the Zibo–Dongying railway in 1972. Work on upgrading the station began on 9 July 2021.

See also
Dongying South railway station

References 

Railway stations in Shandong
Railway stations in China opened in 1972